Bard (Issime ) is a town and comune in the Aosta Valley region of northwestern Italy. It is part of the Unité des communes valdôtaines du Mont-Rose and has a population of 134.

Fort Bard is a fortified complex built in the 19th century by the House of Savoy on a rocky prominence above the town. After many years of neglect, it has been completely restored. In 2006 It reopened to tourists as the home for the Museum of the Alps. The fort also has art exhibitions. In the summer, the main courtyard is used to host musical and theatrical performances.

History

Bard lies at the centre of a deep, narrow gorge at the head of the Aosta valley. This strategic point has been inhabited since the Neolithic period as archaeologists have found several large engraved stones around the area. It later became a major route between Celtic Gaul and the Roman world of the Italian peninsula.

Today the town has many buildings dating back to the 16th century. These include the Bishop's House and the House of the Sun Dial. The Dora Baltea is also crossed by a Medieval stone bridge

Fort Bard, which protects the pass, is built on the site of many earlier fortifications. In May 1800, it halted an entire French army launching a surprise attack on Northern Italy. It eventually fell to the division of French general Joseph Chabran on June 1, 1800.

Geography and climate
Bard is located at the narrowest point of the Aosta Valley. At this point, the Dora Baltea makes a sharp turn around the large rock promontory on which Fort Bard is located. The steep valley sides means the village is full of small streets that are bordered with historic stone buildings.

The climate is mild for most of the year. The winter is cold but generally dry.

Economy
Economy is typical of the area, where agriculture, handicraft and tourism take the major role.

Culture

Cinema
Bard has been a setting for numerous works of fiction and movies, including films, such as Avengers: Age of Ultron.

Gallery

References

External links
 
  Bard official website
 Bard page on "The most beautiful villages in Italy" website